Jonathan Morgan is an English football coach and former player, who is the current manager of Sheffield United. He was previously manager of Leicester City and Burnley F.C. Women. As a player, he played in the Conference North.

Career
Morgan played football in the Conference North. He started his coaching career with Leicester City women's reserve team, and took charge of the senior team in 2014, when they were in FA Women's Midlands Division One. In 2018, Morgan helped Leicester to successfully apply for entry to the semi-professional FA Women's Championship. In 2020, Leicester women's team were taken over by their male counterparts; Morgan retained his job after the takeover. As of 2020, Morgan was applying for a UEFA A Licence.

Leicester won the 2020–21 FA Women's Championship, and were promoted to the FA Women's Super League for the 2021–22 season. Morgan was named the LMA Championship Manager of the Year for the 2020–21 season. On 25 November 2021, Morgan was sacked as Leicester manager, after the team lost their first eight matches in the WSL. He was replaced by Emile Heskey as interim Leicester manager, and his father and one of his sisters were also sacked by Leicester at the same time.

In May 2022, Morgan was appointed head coach of Burnley F.C. Women. Under his tenure, Burnley went unbeaten for the first 16 matches of the 2022–23 season without defeat, and were undefeated in all 12 league matches that he coached Burnley. In February 2023, Morgan became head coach of Sheffield United.

Personal life
Morgan lives in Glen Parva, Leicestershire. His sister Holly played for Leicester, and later became a first-team coach at the club. His other sister Jade has been the general manager of Leicester. Their father Rohan has been a chairman of the club.

References

External links

Living people
English footballers
English football managers
Women's Super League managers
Year of birth missing (living people)
Association footballers not categorized by position
Leicester City W.F.C. managers
Footballers from Leicestershire